The 2003 WUSA Founders Cup, also known as Founders Cup III, was the third and final championship match in Women's United Soccer Association history, played between the Atlanta Beat and the Washington Freedom to decide the champion of the league's final season. The game was played at Torero Stadium in San Diego, California on August 24, 2003. The Washington Freedom defeated the Beat 2-1.

Match

Statistics

Source

References

2003 Women's United Soccer Association season